Wae Gong (왜공), which translates from Korean as External Power, is the development of physical combat skills which takes the form of offensive and defensive techniques, kicking combinations in both hard/linear and soft/circular movements, the achievement of complete physical control.

References

See also
 Korean martial arts
 Hard and soft (martial arts)

Korean martial arts